C99 is a past version of the C programming language standard.

C99 or C-99 may also refer to:

Science and technology
 C99, a C compiler for the TI-99/4A home computer
 C99, a fragment of the amyloid precursor protein created by beta-secretase
 C99Shell, also known as C99, is a malicious web shell

Other uses
 C99, a model of Beechcraft Model 99 aircraft
 Convair C-99, a military aircraft
 Ruy Lopez (ECO code), a chess opening
 Minimum Wage Fixing Machinery (Agriculture) Convention, 1951 (ILO code)
 C99, is also known as Coalsack Nebula

See also
 HMS Blake (C99), a 1945 British Royal Navy cruiser

es:C (lenguaje de programación)#C99
it:C (linguaggio)#C99